John McKay Forrester (December 1921 – 4 September 1978) was a Scottish trade union official, who served on the National Executive Committee of the Labour Party.

Forrester was born in Clydebank and attended Clydebank High School, then undertook an engineering apprenticeship.  Through the apprentices' movement, he became interested in socialism, and joined both the Labour Party, later serving as chair of Clydebank Constituency Labour Party.  He also joined the Association of Engineering and Shipbuilding Draughtsmen (AESD), and aged only 24, he began working full-time for the union, its youngest ever official.  He spent much of his career in Manchester, focusing on building up trade unionism among clerical workers in the engineering industry, while maintaining close links with manual workers.

At the 1955 United Kingdom general election, Forrester stood unsuccessfully for the Labour Party in the City of Chester.  He was recognised as being on the left-wing of the Labour Party, serving on the executive of the Chile Solidarity Campaign, as vice president of the Campaign Against Youth Unemployment, and as a member of the National Peace Council, and as the union's delegate to the National Committee of Anti-Apartheid.

Forrester served on the National Executive of the AESD, and in 1973 he was elected as deputy general secretary of its successor, the Amalgamated Union of Engineering Workers Technical, Administrative and Supervisory Section.  He was also elected to represent the union on the National Executive Committee (NEC) of the Labour Party.  On his death, The Times noted that it would "rob the left [of the NEC] of one of its strongest supporters".

References

1921 births
1978 deaths
Labour Party (UK) parliamentary candidates
People from Clydebank
Scottish trade unionists